Penicillium senticosum is an anamorph species of fungus in the genus Penicillium.

References

senticosum
Fungi described in 1968